1964 college football season may refer to:

 1964 NCAA University Division football season
 1964 NCAA College Division football season
 1964 NAIA football season